Battery "M" 1st Michigan Light Artillery Regiment was an artillery battery that served in the Union Army during the American Civil War.

Service
Battery "M"  was organized at Detroit, Mount Clemens and Dearborn, Michigan and mustered into service on June 30, 1863.

The battery was mustered out on August 1, 1865.

Total strength and casualties
Over its existence, the battery carried a total of 261 men on its muster rolls.

The battery endured 18 fatalities during the war; three soldiers killed in action or mortally wounded and another 15 enlisted men who died of disease.

Commanders
Captain Edwin G. Hilliar

See also
List of Michigan Civil War units
Michigan in the American Civil War

Notes

References
The Civil War Archive

Artillery
1865 disestablishments in Michigan
Artillery units and formations of the American Civil War
1863 establishments in Michigan
Military units and formations established in 1863
Military units and formations disestablished in 1865